Darko Čohadarević (born 7 March 1986) is a Serbian professional basketball player, who plays as a power forward for BK Olomoucko of the National Basketball League.

References

External links
  at eurobasket.com
  at realgm.com
  at espn.com
  at aek.com

1986 births
Living people
AEK B.C. players
AEK Larnaca B.C. players
Gunma Crane Thunders players
Ilysiakos B.C. players
KK Rabotnički players
Osaka Evessa players
Power forwards (basketball)
Serbian men's basketball players
Serbian expatriate basketball people in Cyprus
Serbian expatriate basketball people in the Czech Republic
Serbian expatriate basketball people in France
Serbian expatriate basketball people in Georgia (country)
Serbian expatriate basketball people in Greece
Serbian expatriate basketball people in Hungary
Serbian expatriate basketball people in Japan
Serbian expatriate basketball people in New Zealand
Serbian expatriate basketball people in North Macedonia
Serbian expatriate basketball people in Saudi Arabia
Serbian expatriate basketball people in Slovenia
Serbian expatriate basketball people in Tunisia
Serbian expatriate basketball people in the United States
Texas Tech Red Raiders basketball players
ZTE KK players